Roseovarius halotolerans is a Gram-negative, aerobic and non-motile bacterium from the genus of Roseovarius which has been isolated from deep seawater from the Sea of Japan in Korea.

References 

Rhodobacteraceae
Bacteria described in 2009